Zirkuh Rural District may refer to:
 Zirkuh Rural District (Isfahan Province)
 Zirkuh Rural District (South Khorasan Province)